Brooks Memorial State Park is a public recreation area in the southern Cascade Mountains located  northeast of Goldendale, Washington. The  state park features   of hiking and equestrian trails through ponderosa pine forest along a prong of the Little Klickitat River as well as camping, picnicking, wildlife viewing, and an environmental learning center, the Brooks Memorial Retreat Center. The park also contains a disc golf course in the forest that was established in 2017.

History
 
The park was established after the state acquired six parcels of land between 1944 and 1957. The park was named in honor of Judge Nelson B. Brooks (1858-1928), a local administrator who was noted for establishing and improving roads in Klickitat County in the late 19th and early 20th centuries.

References

External links
Brooks Memorial State Park Washington State Parks and Recreation Commission 
Brooks Memorial State Park Map Washington State Parks and Recreation Commission

Parks in Klickitat County, Washington
State parks of Washington (state)